Vassady Khotyotha is a Laotian politician. She is a member of the Lao People's Revolutionary Party. She is a representative of the National Assembly of Laos for Attapu Province (Constituency 17)

References

Members of the National Assembly of Laos
Lao People's Revolutionary Party politicians
Year of birth missing (living people)
Living people
21st-century Laotian women politicians
21st-century Laotian politicians
People from Attapeu province